The Haihaiyavansi Kingdom was a kingdom which consisted of the central part of the present-day state of Chhattisgarh located in India. According to a popular theory, the Haihayavanshi kingdom consisted of thirty-six garhs or feudal territories, and hence, the region of Chhattisgarh was named after the number of forts it had. In 1740, the Maratha general of Nagpur, Bhaskar Pant conquered the kingdom for Raghoji I Bhonsle. The Raipur branch of the kingdom survived until 1753, also being annexed by the Marathas of Nagpur.

The last ruler was Mohan Singh, who ruled under the suzerainty of Raghoji Bhonsle of Nagpur and died in 1758.

Origin
The kingdom originated as the eastern province of the tenth-century Kalachuri or Chedi kingdom, which was centered in the upper Narmada River valley. The Kalachuris ruled from a capital at Tewar (Tripuri) near modern Jabalpur. By the eleventh century the Ratnapura branch, had settled in the upper Mahanadi basin, and in the twelfth century became independent. For over six centuries the upper Mahanadi basin remained under the control of the Haihayavanshi rajas claiming descent from the Ratnapura Kalachuris.

History
The kingdom was located east of the main routes between northern and southern India, and thus was unaffected by the Muslim invasions of the 13th-16th centuries. The kingdom enjoyed 700 years of peaceful existence due to its borders being protected by precipitous mountain ranges on almost all sides.

On the accession of Suradeva, the twentieth king, the kingdom was divided between him at Ratanpur and his younger brother Brahmadeva founded a  younger branch at Raipur to the south. It has been conjectured that the name Mahakosal, the greater Kosala, was made common for Dakshin Kosal or Chhattisgarh by the Chedi - Haihayavanshi rulers of this region to make their kingdom sound more dignified and their sovereignty seem more pronounced. The town of Amarkantak is said to have been built by the Haihayavanshis.

Maratha invasion

The kingdom came under Maratha suzerainty with the Maratha invasions of the 18th century. Marathas of the Bhonsle clan of Nagpur established themselves in Berar at the beginning of the 18th century, and conquered the neighboring Gond kingdom of Deogarh in 1743. 
The Bhonsle Maratha armies passed through Chhattisgarh on their way to invade the Odia kingdoms in eastern India. Bhaskar Pant invaded the Haihaiyavanshi Kingdom at the close of 1740. According to Sir Charles Grant, his army is said to have consisted of 40,000 men, chiefly horse. The branch Haihaiyavanshi ruler of Raipur, Amar Singh, did not oppose him. However, the Haihaiyavanshi ruler of Ratanpur, Raghunath Singh offered resistance by shutting himself in his fort.

According to Sir Charles Grant, Raghunath Singh was bowed down with a heavy sorrow, which was the loss of his only son. He refused to take any interest in the government for nearly a year. At best, he was a feeble man, but now worn out with years and afflicted in mind. The raja made no effort to defend his kingdom and waited till Bhaskar Pant reached his capital. Even then, there was no resistance from the defenders. Bhaskar Pant bought his guns to play on the fort, and soon a part of the palace was in ruins. At this point, one of the Ranis (queen) named Laxmi hoisted a white flag on the ramparts of the fort. The gates for opened, and the invading Marathas entered the fort and looted the city.

A fine of one lakh rupees was imposed on the town and all the wealth that remained in the treasury was seized. Then the country was pillaged in all directions by the Maratha army. However, Raghunath Singh was not harmed in any manner and allowed to rule at Ratanpur under the suzerainty of the Marathas. Having crushed the Haihaiyavanshi king, the nominal overlord of the many petty chieftains and surrounding states, the Marathas demanded that the petty rulers submit to them, and the rulers did.

Raigarh fell to the Bhonsles in 1741, and by 1742 Maratha control over the kingdom was firmly established.

Administration
As per writer Saurabh Dube, the two kingdoms were each subdivided into 18 districts which were known as garhs (forts), and were under the charge of thakurs or diwans, who owed allegiance to the Rajput king. The garh was also known as chaurasi (eighty-four) because it was meant to be made up of 84 villages. The garhs were in turn made up of smaller units called taluks. The taluk, which was supposed to contain 12 villages and was also known as bahron (twelve) was held by a dao or barhainya whose authority in the unit closely resembled that of the diwan within the taluk. The village was held by a gaonthia or headman.

Further reading

See also
Heheya Kingdom

References

Medieval India
Empires and kingdoms of India
History of Chhattisgarh